Velma Middleton (September 1, 1917 – February 10, 1961) was an American jazz vocalist and entertainer who sang with Louis Armstrong's big bands and small groups from 1942 until her death.

Biography

Middleton was born in Holdenville, Oklahoma, and moved with her parents to St. Louis, Missouri. She started her career as a chorus girl and dancer and throughout her career performed acrobatic splits on stage. After working as a solo performer, and singing with Connie McLean and his Rhythm Orchestra on a tour of South America, she joined Armstrong's big band in 1942, and appeared with him in soundies.

When Armstrong's orchestra disbanded in 1947, Middleton joined his All-Stars, a smaller group. She was often used for comic relief, such as for duets with Armstrong on "That's My Desire" and "Baby, It's Cold Outside", and she did occasional features. She also recorded eight tracks as a solo singer for Dootone Records in 1948 and 1951.  Although she was not widely praised for her voice, described by critic Scott Yanow as "average but reasonably pleasing and good-humored", Armstrong regarded her as an important and integral part of his show.

Middleton performed on June 7, 1953 with Louis Armstrong and his All Stars for the famed ninth Cavalcade of Jazz concert held at Wrigley Field in Los Angeles which was produced by Leon Hefflin, Sr. Also featured that day were Don Tosti and His Mexican Jazzmen, Roy Brown and his Orchestra, Shorty Rogers, Earl Bostic, and Nat "King" Cole.

While touring with Armstrong in Sierra Leone, she suffered a stroke in January 1961, and died the following month in a hospital in Freetown. 

Musician Barney Bigard was critical of Armstrong as well as manager Joe Glaser for refusing, after Middleton took  ill, to arrange her transfer to a country with better health facilities.

References

Further reading
 Forbes, Mike. Louis Armstrong's All Stars. Surrey: J Michael Forbes, 2015.

External links
Velma Middleton at JazzLives

1917 births
1961 deaths
Jazz musicians from Oklahoma
People from Holdenville, Oklahoma
20th-century American singers
American jazz singers
American women jazz singers
Dixieland singers
Deaths in Sierra Leone
20th-century American women singers